Senven-Léhart is a commune in the Côtes-d'Armor department of Brittany in northwestern France. It is about 16 km south of Ploumagoar.

The chapel of Saint-Tugdual dates from the 16th century, and the village Calvary dates from the 17th century and is a scheduled monument.

Population

Inhabitants of Senven-Léhart are called senvennois in French.

See also
Communes of the Côtes-d'Armor department
Roland Doré sculptor

References

External links

Communes of Côtes-d'Armor